Tyzik is a surname. Notable people with the surname include:
Jeff Tyzik, American composer, arranger, and trumpeter
Mr. Tyzik, a character from The Kids in the Hall

References